Damien John Ryan (born 3 August 1977) is a former Australian rules footballer who played with Richmond and St Kilda in the Australian Football League (AFL).

Ryan was a defender, selected with Richmond's first pick and 11th overall in the 1994 National Draft. He spent three years playing senior football at Richmond before again nominating for the draft and being selected by St Kilda at pick 43. In his first season with St Kilda he made 20 appearances, double his previous season's best, but he added just five more games in each of his next two seasons.

References

External links
 
 

1977 births
Living people
Australian rules footballers from Victoria (Australia)
Richmond Football Club players
St Kilda Football Club players
Eastern Ranges players